Niamh Mulcahy is a camogie player, winner of the Young Player of the Year award in 2007. She was player of the match when Limerick won the All Ireland Senior B championship in 2007 on a team managed by Ciarán Carey, having secured a replay for Limerick with a long-range free in the final against Cork in the
Gaelic Grounds. She was nominated for an All Star in 2009. With a total of 1-29 she was the highest scoring player in the Intermediate Championship of 2011.

Family
Her granduncle was hurling team of the century member Mick Mackey, her grandfather was All Ireland medalist John Mackey, her father Ger was an inter-county hurler and her mother Vera an inter-county camogie player for Limerick and a member of the only ever Limerick Senior team to reach the Al Ireland final, when Cork beat them in 1980 after a replay.

Association football
Mulcahy also represented the Republic of Ireland women's national football team at under-17, under-19 and university level.

References

External links
 Profile in Cúl4kidz magazine

Living people
21st-century Irish people
Year of birth missing (living people)
Limerick camogie players
Alumni of Mary Immaculate College, Limerick
Republic of Ireland women's association footballers
Association footballers from County Limerick
Women's association footballers not categorized by position
Republic of Ireland women's youth international footballers